Engibar Engibarov (Bulgarian: Енгибар Енгибаров; born 5 September 1971) is a former Bulgarian footballer who played as a defender.

Managerial career
On 29 December 2017 he was announced as the new manager of his youth club Spartak Varna. He managed to secure the first place in Third League without submitting a loss in a league math. On 6 June 2019 he was announced as the new manager of the First League team Vitosha Bistritsa.

Career statistics

Club

References

External links
 

1971 births
Living people
Bulgarian footballers
Bulgaria international footballers
PFC Spartak Varna players
PFC Beroe Stara Zagora players
Botev Plovdiv players
PFC Slavia Sofia players
PFC CSKA Sofia players
VfL Bochum players
SpVgg Greuther Fürth players
PFC Cherno More Varna players
PFC Belasitsa Petrich players
FC Dunav Ruse players
First Professional Football League (Bulgaria) players
2. Bundesliga players
Sportspeople from Varna, Bulgaria
Bulgarian people of Armenian descent
Association football fullbacks
Bulgarian football managers